In number theory, a Pierpont prime is a prime number of the form

They are named after the mathematician James Pierpont, who used them to characterize the regular polygons that can be constructed using conic sections. The same characterization applies to polygons that can be constructed using ruler, compass, and angle trisector, or using paper folding.

Except for 2 and the Fermat primes, every Pierpont prime must be 1 modulo 6. The first few Pierpont primes are:

It has been conjectured that there are infinitely many Pierpont primes, but this remains unproven.

Distribution 

If  is positive then  must also be positive (because  would be an even number greater than 2 and therefore not prime), and therefore the non-Fermat Pierpont primes all have the form , when  is a positive integer (except for 2, when ).

Empirically, the Pierpont primes do not seem to be particularly rare or sparsely distributed; there are 42 Pierpont primes less than 106, 65 less than 109, 157 less than 1020, and 795 less than 10100. There are few restrictions from algebraic factorisations on the Pierpont primes, so there are no requirements like the Mersenne prime condition that the exponent must be prime.
As there are  numbers of the correct form in this range, there should be  Pierpont primes.

According to Gleason's conjecture there are  Pierpont primes smaller than N, as opposed to the smaller conjectural number  of Mersenne primes in that range.

Primality testing
When ,  is a Proth number and thus its primality can be tested by Proth's theorem.

Pierpont primes found as factors of Fermat numbers 

As part of the ongoing worldwide search for factors of Fermat numbers, some Pierpont primes have been announced as factors. The following table gives values of m, k, and n such that

The left-hand side is a Fermat number; the right-hand side is a Pierpont prime.

, the largest known Pierpont prime is 2 × 310852677 &hairsp;+ 1 (5,178,044 decimal digits), whose primality was discovered in January 2023.

Polygon construction
In the mathematics of paper folding, the Huzita axioms define six of the seven types of fold possible. It has been shown that these folds are sufficient to allow the construction of the points that solve any cubic equation.
This is the same class of regular polygons as those that can be constructed with a compass, straightedge, and angle trisector.

In 1895, James Pierpont studied the same class of regular polygons; his work is what gives the name to the Pierpont primes. Pierpont generalized compass and straightedge constructions in a different way, by adding the ability to draw conic sections whose coefficients come from previously constructed points. Since the totient of a prime is formed by subtracting one from it, the primes  for which Pierpont's construction works are exactly the Pierpont primes. However, Pierpont did not describe the form of the composite numbers with 3-smooth totients. As Gleason later showed, these numbers are exactly the ones of the form  given above.

The smallest prime that is not a Pierpont (or Fermat) prime is 11; therefore, the hendecagon is the first regular polygon that cannot be constructed with compass, straightedge and angle trisector (or origami, or conic sections). All other regular  with  can be constructed with compass, straightedge and trisector.

Generalization 

A Pierpont prime of the second kind is a prime number of the form 2u3v − 1. These numbers are

A generalized Pierpont prime is a prime of the form  with k fixed primes p1 < p2 < p3 < ... < pk. A generalized Pierpont prime of the second kind is a prime of the form  with k fixed primes p1 < p2 < p3 < ... < pk. Since all primes greater than 2 are odd, in both kinds p1 must be 2. The sequences of such primes in the OEIS are:

See also
Proth prime, the primes of the form  where k and n are positive integers,  is odd and

References

Classes of prime numbers
Unsolved problems in number theory